Linet Arasa (born January 1, 1996) is a Kenyan rugby sevens player. She competed at the 2016 Summer Olympics for the Kenyan women's national sevens team.

References

External links 
 
 
 Linet Moraa Arasha at ShujaaPride.com

1996 births
Living people
Female rugby sevens players
Rugby sevens players at the 2016 Summer Olympics
Olympic rugby sevens players of Kenya
Kenya international rugby sevens players
Kenya international women's rugby sevens players